The Togo fan-footed gecko (Ptyodactylus togoensis) is a species of gecko. It is found in northern Africa.

References

Ptyodactylus
Reptiles described in 1901